"Skin Deep" is a song by British band the Stranglers, released in September 1984 as the lead single from the album Aural Sculpture.

The shimmering and melodic single restored the band to the UK top 20 after its previous two single releases (from the album Feline) had stalled at numbers 48 and 35. "Skin Deep" peaked at No. 11 in Australia and Ireland.

The music video consists of the band performing the song, interspersed with shots of a snake crawling over a person and the band removing face masks towards the end of the video, finishing with a shot of the aural sculpture featured on the parent album cover.

Track listings

7" singles  
A. "Skin Deep" the – 3:55
B. "Here and There" – 4:21

12" single 
A. "Skin Deep" (Extended Version) – 7:12
B1. "Here and There" – 4:21
B2. "Vladimir and the Beast (Part III)" – 3:55

Chart performance

Weekly charts

Year-end charts

References

External links
 Skin Deep at Discogs.com

1984 singles
The Stranglers songs
Songs written by Dave Greenfield
Songs written by Hugh Cornwell
Songs written by Jean-Jacques Burnel
Songs written by Jet Black
Epic Records singles
1984 songs